Igor Bortnikov (born June 8, 1989) is a Russian professional ice hockey forward who currently plays for Neftyanik Almetievsk of the Supreme Hockey League (VHL). He first played in the Kontinental Hockey League with his original youth club, HC Neftekhimik Nizhnekamsk.

References

External links

1989 births
Living people
Admiral Vladivostok players
HC Neftekhimik Nizhnekamsk players
HC Yugra players
Russian ice hockey forwards